Wizardry 8 is the eighth and final title in the Wizardry series of role-playing video games by Sir-Tech Canada. It is the third in the Dark Savant trilogy, which includes Wizardry VI: Bane of the Cosmic Forge and Wizardry VII: Crusaders of the Dark Savant. It was published in 2001 by Sir-Tech, and re-released by Night Dive Studios on GOG.com and Steam in 2013.

Story
The aim of Wizardry 8 is to collect artifacts and to place them on its pedestal in the final zone. This allows the player to ascend to the Cosmic Circle, in which the player can become a god.

Beginnings
Wizardry 8 has five beginnings that continue from the producers previous games' multiple endings. In the final area of Wizardry VII, the player has a choice to tell their partner whether or not they have a way to leave the planet Guardia. If the party follows the path of truth, the Girl and Globe endings are open to them. If they lie, the Umpani, T'Rang and Globe endings are open to them.

Main Story
Although the circumstances of the player's entrance into the world remain vague, the goal of finding the artifacts needed to ascend to godhood remains. The player must find the key to life, the key to knowledge and the key to change.

When the artifacts are in the possession of the player they will go to Ascension Peak to begin the path of becoming a god. After travelling to their castle and becoming Rapax Templars the way to the Peak will open. 

In the Cosmic Circle, the Dark Savant has already arrived and is speaking with Aletheides, the cyborg that the party either joins or follows to planet Guardia in Wizardry VII, depending on their choices in Wizardry VI. The Dark Savant kills Aletheides in anger. As the player approaches they will find that the Cosmic Forge is back in the Circle where it should be (its theft is detailed in Wizardry VI).

The Dark Savant reveals to the player that he is Phoonzang, the enigmatic god figure from both Wizardry VII and 8, and a former Cosmic Lord. The other Cosmic Lords cast him down for trying to share the knowledge of the universe with mortals (e.g., humans, T'Rang, elves), and he was forced to become part machine to continue to live past a normal man's lifespan. He then offers the party the chance to join him, and become Cosmic Lords along with him.

Endings
The player, at this point, has three choices which lead to different endings:

The "Savant" ending
The player's party joins the Dark Savant. They are then forced to kill Bela and, if she's present, Vi.  Afterward, the party and the Savant use the Cosmic Forge to pen the destiny of the universe. This destiny is a malevolent one, and the narrator explains this to the player, along with the Savant, gains great satisfaction out of dividing and setting numerous alien races against one another in violent, unending combat. The game ends with the narrator explaining just how in tune with the Dark Savant's evil the player and their party really is.
The "Pen" ending
The party decides to use the Cosmic Forge to write the Dark Savant out of existence, and bring Phoonzang back. They are not quick enough, however, and are forced to kill the Savant/Phoonzang. Luckily, the universe is ultimately saved, and the player's party ascends to look after its destiny as its gods, performing benevolent works such as forging an everlasting peace between the Umpani and the T'rang (provided that both races survived the events of the game), and giving the Rapax qualities like kindness and empathy, turning them into a much more civilized race and thus quelling their desire for world domination.
The "Book" ending
The player decides to rip out the page in the book of destiny where Phoonzang became the Savant, but in the process, change or destroy all the pages that come after it. As the magic of the Cosmic Forge takes some time to occur, they are forced to fight the Savant to the death. Fortunately, tearing the page out causes the Savant to revert to Phoonzang, alive and well, once more. Unfortunately, a lot of other events were willed out of existence by having so many pages torn from the book, and Phoonzang explains that the party has destroyed the Universe. The party ascends at this point, and with Phoonzang's help, they begin the arduous task of restoring the universe's history in order to set the timeline right once again.

Gameplay
In Wizardry 8, the player creates a party of six adventurers at the start of the game. Each race and class has a balance of strengths and weaknesses. The various races and classes are designed to be balanced so that a wide variety of parties can be playable. Characters may change their class as they advance, allowing a variety of combinations.

The game itself is played from a first-person perspective. Movement is fluid, whereas in previous Wizardry games it was grid-based. For the first time in the Wizardry series, players can see enemies approaching instead of having them pop up from chance. Combat is turn-based, although a continuous-phase mode can be toggled. Monsters are scaled to the party level; higher level parties will face different sets of monsters than a lower-level party in the same area.  The scaling is limited to allow variation in difficulty.

Wizardry 8 uses different statistics from the previous games, necessitating conversions from the upper limit of 18 to the new upper limit of 100.

For players seeking a more difficult challenge, Sir-Tech brought back an option to play using rules from the early Wizardry games – the "Iron Man Mode". In this "permadeath" mode, players are not allowed to save the game manually; instead, the game is automatically saved when the player quits.

There are many secret areas, including "retro dungeons", which hearken to the dungeons of (Proving Grounds of the Mad Overlord). Instead of vast, open views, players are greeted with a solid, traditional grid-based dungeon. Spinners, traps and teleporters are used.

Development
Wizardry 8 was published nine years after the previous title, Wizardry VII: Crusaders of the Dark Savant in 1992, and five years after the completion of Wizardry VII's Windows 95 version, titled Wizardry Gold in 1996.

David W. Bradley had been the chief designer of Wizardry VI and VII, but he was not involved in the design of this game. After Bradley's departure, Sir-Tech outsourced the development of Wizardry 8: Stones of Arnhem to DirectSoft, their distributor in Australia. This team consisted of programmer Cleveland Blakemore (Grimoire: Heralds of the Winged Exemplar) and Actor Max Phipps. However, this attempt failed and Directsoft disbanded, so they relaunched the project entirely with Sir-Tech Canada. Linda Currie is credited as producer of Wizardry 8. Brenda Romero was the game's lead designer.

In spite of a 'final save' after the final battle, Sir-Tech announced that they had no plans to make a sequel. The company later went out of business in 2003.

Despite the closing of the development studio, Sir-Tech continued to provide support and created several patches or upgrades for the game for years after release. This support was provided with the collective help of the Wizardry 8 developers who donated their time. Fans of the series have continued the efforts, providing editors, mods and game info.

Reception

Wizardry 8 received "generally favorable reviews" according to the review aggregation website Metacritic.

In 2017, Wizardry 8 made an appearance on IGN's "Top 100 RPGs of All Time" list at #99. Over a decade after the game's original release, IGN's Chris Reed praised the game's character creation tools and party system, citing the "stunning number of combinations to try in your party".

Awards
Wizardry 8 was named the best computer role-playing game of 2001 by Computer Gaming World, GameSpot and—tying with Arcanum: Of Steamworks and Magick Obscura—Computer Games Magazine. RPG Vault, The Electric Playground, GameSpy and the Academy of Interactive Arts & Sciences  nominated it as the year's top role-playing game, but gave these awards variously to Dark Age of Camelot, Arcanum and Baldur's Gate II: Throne of Bhaal. However, it won RPG Vault's "Outstanding Achievement in Music" and "Lifetime Achievement Award" prizes. GameSpot also named Wizardry 8 the year's tenth best computer game overall.

While awarding the game, the editors of Computer Gaming World called Wizardry 8 "an awesome achievement. It's an old-school, turn-based unapologetically hardcore labor of love from veteran game makers who knew exactly what they were doing." Those of Computer Games Magazine hailed it as "Sir-Tech's opus" and as "the best party-based loot-gathering dungeon-crawl you've played since Crusaders of the Dark Savant."

Additional awards include:
 Best Single Player RPG of 2001, RPGDot
 Best Sound in an RPG of 2001, RPGDot
 Editor's Choice Award, ActionTrip
 Editor's Choice Award, GamePen

General references 
Wizardry 8 Official strategies & secrets, Mark H. Walker, SYBEX, Inc. (2001).

References

External links
 
 Patches and utilities downloads for Wizardry 8

2001 video games
Electronic Arts games
First-person party-based dungeon crawler video games
MacOS games
Role-playing video games
Single-player video games
Video game sequels
Video games developed in Canada
Video games featuring protagonists of selectable gender
Video games scored by Kevin Manthei
Windows games
Wizardry
Video games designed by Brenda Romero